LaVon Bracy Davis is an American attorney and politician serving as a member of the Florida House of Representatives for the 40th district. She assumed office on November 8, 2022.

Early life and education 
Bracy was born in Rochester, New York. Her brother is former state senator Randolph Bracy. She earned a Bachelor of Fine Arts degree from Howard University and a Juris Doctor from the Florida A&M University College of Law.

Career 
Bracy served as a senior attorney for the Florida Department of Children and Families before joining the Dr. Phillips Center for the Performing Arts as director of community programming. She was elected to the Florida House of Representatives in November 2022.

References 

Living people
Democratic Party members of the Florida House of Representatives
Women state legislators in Florida
Politicians from Rochester, New York
Howard University alumni
Florida A&M University alumni
Florida lawyers
21st-century American women politicians
21st-century American women lawyers
21st-century American politicians
21st-century American lawyers
Year of birth missing (living people)